Lelekovice is a municipality and village in Brno-Country District in the South Moravian Region of the Czech Republic. It has about 1,900 inhabitants.

The asteroid 167208 Lelekovice was named in its honour by the co-discoverer and native of Lelekovice, Kamil Hornoch.

Notable people
Kamil Hornoch (born 1972), astronomer

References

External links

 

Villages in Brno-Country District